

Gerald Lee Vincke (born July 9, 1964) is an American prelate of the Roman Catholic Church. He has been serving as bishop for the Diocese of Salina in Kansas since 2018.

Biography

Early life 
Gerald Vincke was born on July 9, 1964, in Saginaw, Michigan. On July 12, 1999, he was ordained to the priesthood for the Diocese of Lansing by Carl  Mengeling.

Vincke worked as a teacher at Father Gabriel Richard High School in Ann Arbor Michigan.

Bishop of Salina
Pope Francis appointed Vincke bishop for the Diocese of Salina on June 13, 2018. He was consecrated as bishop by Archbishop Joseph Naumann on August 22, 2018. 

In September 2018, the Archdiocese of Washington announced that former Cardinal Theodore McCarrick would reside at St. Fidelis Parish in Victoria, Kansas. Vincke explained his decision to permit the arrangement by a need to have mercy while pursuing justice, referring to Maria Goretti, a sainted girl who forgave her killer on her deathbed.In January 2020, it was announced that McCarrick, by then laicized, had moved to an undisclosed location.

In February 2021, Vincke assumed the additional responsibility of being apostolic administrator of the Diocese of Dodge City.  Its bishop, John Brungardt, was being investigated by the Vatican and the Kansas Bureau of Investigation for allegations of child sexual abuse.

See also

 Catholic Church hierarchy
 Catholic Church in the United States
 Historical list of the Catholic bishops of the United States
 List of Catholic bishops of the United States
 Lists of patriarchs, archbishops, and bishops

References

External links
 Diocese of Salina

Roman Catholic bishops of Salina
People from Saginaw, Michigan
1964 births
Living people
Catholics from Michigan
21st-century Roman Catholic bishops in the United States
Bishops appointed by Pope Francis